Fred Warren McLafferty (May 11, 1923 − December 26, 2021) was an American chemist known for his work in mass spectrometry. He is best known for the McLafferty rearrangement reaction that was observed with mass spectrometry.  With Roland Gohlke, he pioneered the technique of gas chromatography–mass spectrometry. He is also known for electron-capture dissociation, a method of fragmenting gas-phase ions.

Early life and education
Fred McLafferty was born in Evanston, Illinois in 1923, but attended grade school in Omaha, Nebraska, graduating from Omaha North High School in 1940.  The urgent requirements of World War II accelerated his undergraduate studies at the University of Nebraska; he obtained his B.S. degree in 1943 and thereafter entered the US armed forces. He served in western Europe during the invasion of Germany and was awarded the Combat Infantryman Badge, a Purple Heart, Five Bronze Star Medals and a Presidential Unit Citation.

He returned to the University of Nebraska in late 1945 and completed his M.S. degree in 1947. He went on to work under William Miller at Cornell University where he earned his Ph.D. in 1950. He went on to a postdoctoral researcher position at the University of Iowa with R.L. Shriner.

Dow Chemical
He took a position at Dow Chemical in Midland, Michigan in 1950 and was in charge of mass spectrometry and gas chromatography from 1950 to 1956. In 1956, he became the Director of Dow's Eastern Research Lab in Framingham, Massachusetts. During this time, he developed the first GC/MS instruments and developed techniques for determining the structure of organic molecules by mass spectrometry, most notably in the discovery of what is now known as the McLafferty rearrangement.

Academic career
From 1964 to 1968, he was Professor of Chemistry at Purdue University. In 1968, he returned to his alma mater, Cornell University, to become the Peter J. W. Debye Professor of Chemistry. He was elected to the United States National Academy of Sciences in 1982. While at Cornell, McLafferty assembled one of the first comprehensive databases of mass spectra and pioneered artificial intelligence techniques to interpret GC/MS results. His PBM STIRS program has widespread use to save hours of time-consuming work otherwise required to manually analyze GC/MS results.

Personal life and death
McLafferty died in Ithaca, New York, on December 26, 2021, at the age of 98.

Honors and awards
1971 ACS Award in Chemical Instrumentation
1981 ACS Award in Analytical Chemistry
1984 William H. Nichols Medal
1985 Oesper Award
1985 J. J. Thomson Gold Medal by International Mass Spectrometry Society
1987 Pittsburgh Analytical Chemistry Award 
1989 Field and Franklin Award for Mass Spectrometry 
1989 University of Naples Gold Medal 
1992 Robert Boyle Gold Medal by the Royal Society of Chemistry 
1996 Chemical Pioneer Award from the American Institute of Chemists
1997 Bijvoet Medal of the Bijvoet Center for Biomolecular Research.
1999 J. Heyrovsky Medal by the Czech Academy of Sciences 
2000 G. Natta Gold Medal by Italian Chemical Society 
2001 Torbern Bergman Medal by the Swedish Chemical Society 
2003 John B. Fenn Distinguished Contribution in Mass Spectrometry by the American Society for Mass Spectrometry (ASMS)
2004 Lavoisier Medal by the French Chemical Society 
2006 Pehr Edman Award by the International Association for Protein Structure
2015 Nakanishi Prize from the American Chemical Society
2019 American Chemical Society designated a National Historic Chemical Landmark  in Midland, MI for the demonstration of the first operating GC-MS by Fred McLafferty and Roland Gohlke.

References

Bibliography

External links
A Conversation with Fred W. McLafferty 2006, 90 minute video, for Cornell University.
 
 

1923 births
2021 deaths
21st-century American chemists
Mass spectrometrists
Purdue University faculty
Cornell University alumni
Cornell University faculty
Members of the United States National Academy of Sciences
Dow Chemical Company employees
Bijvoet Medal recipients
Thomson Medal recipients
Omaha North High School alumni
People from Evanston, Illinois
United States Army personnel of World War II